Michele Mahone is an American television entertainment reporter and comedian.

Early life
Michele was born in Ashland, Kentucky, and currently resides in Los Angeles. Michele was married at the age of seventeen.  At nineteen, she gave birth to a son and was divorced by age twenty.

Career
Michele started her career in Hollywood in 1999 as an entertainment industry make-up artist. A few years later on a set, a popular television shopping host encouraged her to giving hosting a try.  She made an audition tape for the Ultimate Shopping Network and was hired immediately.

Michele had several hosting jobs on various shopping networks, including America's Value Channel and Direct Shopping Network. She caught her break when she was hired as an entertainment reporter for Weekend Today on Australia's Nine Network.  She became known for her Kentucky accent, her catchphrase "How Do!" and her no-nonsense humorous reporting of Hollywood gossip. Mahone was also an entertainment and lifestyle reporter on Nine Network's show, Mornings with Kerri-Anne.

In 2014, Michele was hired as an entertainment reporter for Network Ten's morning show Wake Up where she conducted red carpet interviews with Jennifer Lopez, Keith Urban, Harry Connick Jr. and Randy Jackson.

In May 2015, Michele joined the Gem Shopping Network (GSN) as an on-air host, but was removed from the host list in March 2016, however she came back to the company in July 2016 and moved on in September 2016.

She now is hosting overnights at Shop LC since November 2019

Stand-up comedy
Michele has appeared on the YouTube channel's show, "Comedy Time," and continues to perform live at several California clubs, including The Comedy Store, The Ice House, The Laugh Factory, The HAHA Cafe, Flappers. Michele's favorite topics in her stand-up routines are her own family, southern culture, the occasional moonshine mishap and often draws from her experience as a Kentucky native who has toured the world.  She begins her sets by greeting the crowd with her catchphrase, "How Do!"

Radio
In 2009, Michele started working in Australian radio with Brisbane's 4BC breakfast show, Jamie and Ian. She has made guest appearances on numerous radio shows throughout Australia, Canada and the United States.

Personal life
Michele was married January 1, 2011 to her second husband and currently lives in LA.

References

External links

American television hosts
Living people
Year of birth missing (living people)
People from Ashland, Kentucky
American stand-up comedians
American women comedians
Kentucky women artists
American women television presenters
21st-century American women